William Duncan McCulloch (25 June 1922 – March 1961) was a Scottish footballer who played as a wing half for Stockport County and Rochdale. He made 449 league appearances in total.

Following his retirement, McCulloch was struck down by multiple sclerosis and died in Manchester in 1961, at the age of 38.

References

Stockport County F.C. players
Rochdale A.F.C. players
1922 births
1961 deaths
Footballers from Edinburgh
Scottish footballers
Deaths from multiple sclerosis
Association footballers not categorized by position